Thomas Patrick Loughran (November 29, 1902 – July 7, 1982) was an American professional boxer and the former World Light Heavyweight Champion. Statistical boxing website BoxRec lists Loughran as the #7 ranked light heavyweight of all time, while The Ring Magazine founder Nat Fleischer placed him at #4. The International Boxing Research Organization rates Loughran as the 6th best light heavyweight ever. Loughran was named the [[Ring Magazine fighters of the year|Ring Magazine'''s Fighter of the Year]] twice, first in 1929 and again 1931. He was inducted into the Ring Magazine Hall of Fame in 1956 and the International Boxing Hall of Fame in 1991.

Boxing career

Loughran was one of seven children of an Irish immigrant motorman. His effective use of coordinated foot work, sound defense and swift, accurate counter punching is now regarded as a precursor to the techniques practiced in modern boxing.

Loughran fought many middleweight, light heavyweight, and heavyweight champions in his career, including Gene Tunney, Jack Sharkey, and Georges Carpentier. Loughran even achieved a newspaper decision over fistic phenom Harry Greb, whom he first met at age 19. As a light heavyweight, he defeated two future world heavyweight champions: Max Baer and James J. Braddock. Loughran finally fought Primo Carnera for the heavyweight title but lost a decision.

In an interview late in life, Loughran said his loss to Carnera was a pre-arranged fait accompli'': "I had to knock him out to win, I had to agree to that".  Footage of the fight is limited and scarce, but Loughran contended he had Carnera in trouble in Rounds 4 and 10, "but then, when I couldn't finish him, I knew the thing was over". The decision a foregone conclusion, Tommy Loughran told Peter Heller in April, 1972, "I beat (Carnera), no question about it".

Later life

On August 22, 1957, he refereed Floyd Patterson's defense of his heavyweight title vs. 1956 Olympic gold medalist Pete Rademacher, at Sick's Stadium, Seattle. The fight was notable in that Rademacher was the first and only fighter to challenge for the heavyweight crown in his professional debut. There were several knockdowns in the fight; Tommy counted out the challenger at 2:57 of the 6th round.

In the 1960s Loughran retired from having been a long-time, successful broker on Wall Street, where he had dealt in commodities (sugar). He became a keynote speaker, appearing at dinners and banquets, his message an attempt to promote and strengthen the image of boxers and boxing at what for the sport was a troubled time. In addition, Tommy lent color commentary to at least one championship bout, Carlos Ortiz vs. Johnny Bizarro in Pittsburgh, June 20, 1966.

In 2006, the Pennsylvania Historical & Museum Commission raised a historical marker in front of St. Monica's Roman Catholic Church, in his old neighborhood, and reads in part: He boxed during the "Golden Age of Boxing" in many weight classes, beating 10 champs in his 18-year career. The "Philly Phantom" had a scientific style, built on precision and maneuverability rather than brute force. Considered a gentleman both in and out of the ring. Loughran was devoted to his neighborhood and church here.

Professional boxing record
All information in this section is derived from BoxRec, unless otherwise stated.

Official record

All newspaper decisions are officially regarded as “no decision” bouts and are not counted in the win/loss/draw column.

Unofficial record

Record with the inclusion of newspaper decisions in the win/loss/draw column.

See also
List of light heavyweight boxing champions

References

|-

|-

External links

2 minute movie of Loughran vs Jimmy Delaney

1902 births
1982 deaths
American male boxers
American people of Irish descent
American Roman Catholics
Boxers from Philadelphia
Heavyweight boxers
Light-heavyweight boxers
United States Marines
World boxing champions